Brian Alfred Hill (born September 19, 1947) is an American former professional basketball coach.

Early life
Born in East Orange, New Jersey, Hill graduated from Our Lady of the Valley High School in Orange, New Jersey in 1965 and John F. Kennedy College in Nebraska in 1969 with a degree in physical education. Hill was a three-year starter on the Kennedy basketball team.

Coaching career
In 1970, Hill began his coaching career as head coach at Clifford Scott High School in his native East Orange, New Jersey. Hill then was an assistant coach at Montclair State College from 1972 to 1974.

Hill began his tenure at Lehigh University as an assistant coach for one season before being promoted on April 9, 1975 to succeed Tom Pugliese who had resigned sixteen days prior on March 24. He inherited a program whose 1–23 record in 1974–75 was the worst among major colleges nationally. His 75–131 record in eight seasons included a 14–12 performance in 1980–81 which was the Engineers' best campaign in 65 years. He left Lehigh to join Bruce Parkhill's staff at Penn State on April 13, 1983.

Hill began his NBA coaching career in 1986 as an assistant coach for the Atlanta Hawks under  Mike Fratello. The two met at Montclair State College when Hill was studying to be certified as a driver's education teacher.  In 1990, Hill joined the Orlando Magic as an assistant coach under Matt Guokas. He was the head coach of the Orlando Magic from 1993 to 1997 and is the Magic's most successful coach with a record of 191–104. During that time period, he led the Magic to their first NBA Finals in 1995 and also led the team to a 60–22 record the following season.  However, following the loss of star center Shaquille O'Neal to free agency during the off-season, he was fired mid-season in 1997 after a player revolt was led by disgruntled star Penny Hardaway.

Following his firing from the Magic, he became head coach of the third-year, expansion Vancouver Grizzlies in 1997. Hill was fired early in his third season. Following that, he became an assistant coach of the New Jersey Nets, where he remained until the end of the postseason. He was then rehired by the Magic and he led the team to a 36–46 record in the 2005–2006 season.

On May 23, 2007, after multiple media sources reported that Hill would not return to coach the Orlando Magic for the 2007–08 NBA season, but would instead be offered another position within the organization, the Magic released a statement that he would not return as coach of the Magic, although it was reported he was actually fired by general manager Otis Smith. It was a position he had held since May 24, 2005. It was his second stint with the team.

Head coaching record

College

NBA

|-
| style="text-align:left;"|Orlando
| style="text-align:left;"|
|82||50||32|||| style="text-align:center;"|2nd in Atlantic||3||0||3||
| style="text-align:center;"|Lost in First Round
|-
| style="text-align:left;"|Orlando
| style="text-align:left;"|
|82||57||25|||| style="text-align:center;"|1st in Atlantic||21||11||10||
| style="text-align:center;"|Lost in NBA Finals
|-
| style="text-align:left;"|Orlando
| style="text-align:left;"|
|82||60||22|||| style="text-align:center;"|1st in Atlantic||12||7||5||
| style="text-align:center;"|Lost in Conf. Finals
|-
| style="text-align:left;"|Orlando
| style="text-align:left;"|
|49||24||25|||| style="text-align:center;"|(fired)||—||—||—||—
| style="text-align:center;"|—
|-
| style="text-align:left;"|Vancouver
| style="text-align:left;"|
|82||19||63|||| style="text-align:center;"|6th in Midwest||—||—||—||—
| style="text-align:center;"|Missed playoffs
|-
| style="text-align:left;"|Vancouver
| style="text-align:left;"|
|50||8||42|||| style="text-align:center;"|7th in Midwest||—||—||—||—
| style="text-align:center;"|Missed playoffs
|-
| style="text-align:left;"|Vancouver
| style="text-align:left;"|
|22||4||18|||| style="text-align:center;"|(fired)||—||—||—||—
| style="text-align:center;"|—
|-
| style="text-align:left;"|Orlando
| style="text-align:left;"|
|82||36||46|||| style="text-align:center;"|3rd in Southeast||—||—||—||—
| style="text-align:center;"|Missed playoffs
|-
| style="text-align:left;"|Orlando
| style="text-align:left;"|
|82||40||42|||| style="text-align:center;"|3rd in Southeast||4||0||4||
| style="text-align:center;"|Lost in First Round
|- class="sortbottom"
| style="text-align:left;"|Career
| ||673||298||315|||| ||40||18||22||

Personal life
Hill, a graduate of John F. Kennedy College in Nebraska, has two adult children, Kimberly and Christopher. His daughter was diagnosed with cystic fibrosis at 5 years old and, as a result, Hill has supported cystic fibrosis research by holding fundraisers and speaking to crowds about the disease. He and his wife Kay live in Orlando, Florida, where they have remained even after his original departure from the Orlando Magic.

References

External links
 Brian Hill bio at nba.com

1947 births
Living people
American expatriate basketball people in Canada
American men's basketball players
Atlanta Hawks assistant coaches
Basketball coaches from New Jersey
Basketball players from New Jersey
Charlotte Hornets assistant coaches
Detroit Pistons assistant coaches
High school basketball coaches in the United States
Lehigh Mountain Hawks men's basketball coaches
Montclair State Red Hawks men's basketball coaches
New Jersey Nets assistant coaches
New Orleans Hornets assistant coaches
Orlando Magic assistant coaches
Orlando Magic head coaches
Penn State Nittany Lions basketball coaches
Sportspeople from East Orange, New Jersey
Vancouver Grizzlies head coaches